This is the list of cathedrals in Botswana sorted by denomination.

Roman Catholic 
Cathedrals of the Roman Catholic Church in Botswana:
 Our Lady of the Desert Cathedral in Francistown
 Christ the King Cathedral in Gaborone

Anglican
Cathedrals of the Church of the Province of Central Africa in Botswana:
 Cathedral of the Holy Cross in Gaborone

See also
List of cathedrals
Christianity in Botswana

References

Churches in Botswana
Botswana
Cathedrals
Cathedrals